RISE is an album released in 2013 by Annabelle Chvostek.  The album was recorded with producer Don Kerr (Rheostatics) and mixed by Roma Baran (Laurie Anderson, Kate & Anna McGarrigle) and Vivian Stoll (Unknown Gender, Isis). It includes guest vocals from Oh Susanna and Canadian legend Bruce Cockburn.

Other guests include Debashis Sinha of Autorickshaw, David Celia, Tony Spina and Jérémie Jones.

The album is nominated in the Roots & Traditional Album of the Year - Solo category of the 2013 Juno Awards.

Track listing
 End Of The Road (6:14)
 G20 Song (4:32)
 Baby Sleep Till Štúrovo (4:55)
 The Will Of How (4:26)
 All Have Some (4:41)
 Fox Tail (4:05)
 RISE (5:33)
 Hartland Quay (4:27)
 Do You Think You're Right (4:47)
 Ona (3:10)
 Some Kinda Love (4:18)
 Equal Rights (6:48)

References

Annabelle Chvostek albums
2013 albums